The Sweet Hereafter is a 1997 Canadian drama film written and directed by Atom Egoyan, adapted from the 1991 novel by Russell Banks. It tells the story of a school bus accident in a small town that kills 14 children. A class-action lawsuit ensues, proving divisive in the community and becoming tied with personal and family issues. It stars an ensemble cast featuring Ian Holm, Sarah Polley, Maury Chaykin, Bruce Greenwood, Tom McCamus, Gabrielle Rose, Arsinée Khanjian and Alberta Watson.

The film, inspired by the 1989 Alton, Texas, bus crash, was filmed in British Columbia and Ontario, incorporating a film score with medieval music influences and references to the story of the Pied Piper of Hamelin. 

Although The Sweet Hereafter was not a box office success, it was critically acclaimed and won three awards, including the Grand Prix, at the 1997 Cannes Film Festival, along with seven Genie Awards, including Best Motion Picture. It also received two Academy Award nominations, for Best Director and Best Adapted Screenplay. Toronto International Film Festival critics named The Sweet Hereafter one of the top 10 Canadian films of all time.

Plot
In the small town of Sam Dent, British Columbia, a school bus hits a patch of ice, runs through a barrier and crashes into a lake, killing 14 children. The grieving parents are approached by an out-of-town lawyer, Mitchell Stephens, who is haunted by his dysfunctional relationship with his drug-addicted daughter. Stephens persuades the reluctant parents and bus driver Dolores Driscoll to file a class-action lawsuit against the town and bus company for damages, arguing that the accident is a result of negligence in constructing the barrier or the bus.

The case depends on coaching the few surviving witnesses to say the right things in court, particularly Nicole Burnell, a 15-year-old paralyzed from the waist down as a result of the accident. Before the accident, Nicole was an aspiring musician and was being sexually abused by her father, Sam.

One bereft parent, Billy Ansel, distrusts Stephens and pressures Sam to drop the case; Nicole overhears their argument. In the pretrial deposition, Nicole unexpectedly accuses the bus driver Dolores of speeding, halting the lawsuit. Stephens and Sam know she is lying but can do nothing. Two years later, Stephens sees Dolores working as a bus driver in a city.

Cast

 Ian Holm as Mitchell Stephens
 James D. Watts as young Mitchell
 Sarah Polley as Nicole Burnell
 Maury Chaykin as Wendell Walker
 Gabrielle Rose as Dolores Driscoll
 Bruce Greenwood as Billy Ansel
 Tom McCamus as Sam Burnell
 David Hemblen as Abbott Driscoll
 Peter Donaldson as Schwartz
 Brooke Johnson as Mary Burnell
 Arsinée Khanjian as Wanda Otto
 Stephanie Morgenstern as Allison O'Donnell
 Earl Pastko as Hartley Otto
 Alberta Watson as Risa Walker
 Caerthan Banks as Zoe Stephens
 Magdalena Sokoloski as young Zoe
 Simon R. Baker as Bear Otto
 Sarah Rosen Fruitman as Jessica Ansel
 Marc Donato as Mason Ansel
 Devon Finn as Sean Walker
 Fides Krucker as Klara Stephens
 Allegra Denton as Jenny Burnell
 Kirsten Kieferle as Stewardess
 Russell Banks as Dr. Robeson
 Mychael Danna as harmonium player

Production

Adaptation

The Canadian director Atom Egoyan adapted the screenplay after his wife, the actress Arsinée Khanjian, suggested he read Russell Banks' The Sweet Hereafter. The novel is inspired by an incident in Alton, Texas, in 1989, in which a bus crash killed 21 students, leading to multiple lawsuits. Egoyan found it challenging to acquire the rights, as they had been optioned to another studio that was not actually producing it. Shortly before the option expired, novelist Margaret Atwood suggested to Egoyan that he meet with Banks personally after the director's success with the film Exotica (1994), and Banks was willing to grant him the rights. Egoyan later stated he was drawn to filming the novel because he felt film is for "confronting the most extreme things." As an Armenian Canadian, he also saw the story as a metaphor for the Armenian genocide, in which those guilty had not accepted responsibility.

In adapting the novel, Egoyan changed the setting from Upstate New York to British Columbia, to help secure Canadian funding. He also added references to the story of The Pied Piper of Hamelin by Robert Browning, to emphasize how Egoyan saw The Sweet Hereafter as a "grim fairy tale." Nicole is seen reading The Pied Piper to children who later die in the accident. In that story, the Pied Piper leads all the children away, never to return, after their parents refuse to honour their debt to him. Egoyan wrote a new stanza in the Pied Piper style for the scene in which Nicole testifies Dolores was speeding, in which she describes her father's lips as "frozen as the winter moon." Egoyan also made Mitchell Stephens the main character and increased the importance of Stephens' daughter, and moved the revelation of incest between the Burnells to later in the film.

Filming
The film was shot in British Columbia (Merritt and Spences Bridge) and Ontario (Toronto and Stouffville), on a budget of $5 million. Funding came from the company Alliance Communications. Egoyan assembled many Canadian actors he had worked with in prior films, including Bruce Greenwood, Gabrielle Rose and Sarah Polley. Egoyan explained the benefit of working with a familiar cast, saying "When you're working on a limited production schedule, it's a comfort to know that you know the personalities involved, you know what they need as opposed to having to discover that and be surprised by that."

Ian Holm was cast as Mitchell Stephens after the actor originally set to play the character, Donald Sutherland, quit the project. In casting the part, Egoyan was inspired by Holm's "strangely compassionate, yet furtive and menacing" performance in The Homecoming (1973). Holm explained why he accepted the role, saying, "It's not often you get offered a leading role at age 65... This is my first in a movie," and afterwards said the film is "very touching" and "a masterpiece". Holm called his part challenging, as it was his first lead, but he found Egoyan and the Canadian actors to be great to work with.

Music

The Pied Piper references influenced the composer Mychael Danna's music, which uses a Persian ney flute along with old instruments such as recorders, crumhorns and lutes, creating "a pseudo-medieval score." The score thus combined Danna's interests in old and exotic music. Egoyan stated medieval-style music was used to make the film feel timeless, evoking Brothers Grimm fairy tales and avoiding the feel of a TV movie.

Polley's character, Nicole, is an aspiring singer before the accident, and is seen on stage performing Jane Siberry's "One More Colour." Danna and Polley cooperated to create Nicole's music, with Polley writing lyrics to Danna's original songs and Danna arranging the adaptations of "Courage" and "One More Colour". The songs were chosen because of their domestic popularity, reinforcing the local nature of Nicole's music. The Tragically Hip's original version of "Courage" also appears in the film.

Release
The film debuted at the Cannes Film Festival in May 1997, and went on to play at the Toronto International Film Festival, Telluride Film Festival, New York Film Festival and Valladolid International Film Festival. In Canada, the film was distributed by Alliance Communications.  Following its screening at Cannes, Fine Line Features secured rights for the film for distribution in the United States, releasing it there on October 10, 1997.

In Region 1, The Sweet Hereafter was released on DVD in May 1998. In Canada, the film had a Blu-ray release in June 2012, with special features, including interviews.

Reception

Box office
By the spring of 1998, The Sweet Hereafter had grossed $1 million domestically. According to The Numbers, The Sweet Hereafter grossed $4,306,697 in North America and $3,644,550 in other territories, for a worldwide total of $7,951,247. Although Canadian historian George Melnyk said the film achieved "mainstream popularity", another Canadian historian, Reginald C. Stuart, said that the film "aimed for, but did not reach, a mass audience." Dan Webster of The Spokesman-Review concluded that "despite generally good reviews", the film "never attracted much box-office attention."

The Writers Guild of Canada commented that The Sweet Hereafter and contemporary Canadian films "never succeeded in scoring a home run at the international box office." Melnyk suggested Egoyan's previous film Exotica performed better at the box office than The Sweet Hereafter because of Exotica "sexual content ... rather than the early film's artistic merit."

Critical reception

The film holds a 98% rating at Rotten Tomatoes, with an average score of 8.90/10 based on 59 reviews, and a 100% rating from 21 "Top Critic" reviews. The site's consensus reads, "Director Atom Egoyan examines tragedy and its aftermath with intelligence and empathy." On Metacritic, the film has a weighted average score of 91 out of 100, based on 23 critics, indicating "universal acclaim". In 2002, readers of Playback voted it the greatest Canadian film ever made. In 2004, the Toronto International Film Festival ranked it third in the Top 10 Canadian Films of All Time, tied with Goin' Down the Road, and in 2015, it was the sole film in the third spot.

Roger Ebert gave the film four stars, calling it "one of the best films of the year, an unflinching lament for the human condition." Janet Maslin, writing for The New York Times, said "this fusion of Mr. Banks's and Mr. Egoyan's sensibilities stands as a particularly inspired mix", with Sarah Polley and Bruce Greenwood "particularly good here".  Brendan Kelly of Variety praised The Sweet Hereafter as "Egoyan's most ambitious work to date", and as "a rich, complex meditation on the impact of a terrible tragedy on a small town", adding Polley and Tom McCamus are "excellent".

Entertainment Weekly gave the film an A, saying it "puts you in a rapturous emotional daze", and calling it a "hymn to the agony of loss" and "a new kind of mystical fairy tale, one that seeks to uncover the forces holding the world together, even as they tear it apart." Paul Tatara of CNN called The Sweet Hereafter "devastating" and wrote Ian Holm gives "the performance of his hugely impressive career." David Denby of New York magazine said that the film had "Ian Holm's greatest role in the movies" and the cast are "all excellent". The film made over 250 critics' Top 10 lists for the best films of 1997.

In 2004, Slovenian critic Slavoj Žižek called The Sweet Hereafter "arguably  film about the impact of trauma on a community." That year, The New York Times also included the film on its list of "the Best 1,000 Movies Ever Made". In 2011, British director Clio Barnard praised the "real depth" and "healthy ambiguity" of the story and described Holm and Polley as "brilliant", giving "powerful, subtle performances". One year later, The A.V. Club named The Sweet Hereafter the 22nd best film of the 1990s, praising it as a "masterpiece of adaptation".

Accolades
The Sweet Hereafter won three awards at the 1997 Cannes Film Festival: the FIPRESCI Prize, the Grand Prize of the Jury, and the Prize of the Ecumenical Jury. This was the highest honour won at Cannes for a Canadian film and made Egoyan the first Canadian to win the Grand Prix, followed by Xavier Dolan with It's Only the End of the World in 2016.

The Sweet Hereafter also won Best Motion Picture, Best Director, Best Cinematography, Best Actor for Holm, and three other prizes, at the 18th Genie Awards. It was nominated for Best Director and Best Adapted Screenplay at the 70th Academy Awards, but lost to Titanic and L.A. Confidential, respectively.

Notes

References

Bibliography

External links
 
 
 
 

1997 films
1997 drama films
1990s English-language films
English-language Canadian films
Best Picture Genie and Canadian Screen Award winners
Films about dysfunctional families
Canadian disaster films
Films about buses
Films about road accidents and incidents
Legal films
Films about grieving
Films directed by Atom Egoyan
Films set in British Columbia
Films shot in British Columbia
Films shot in Toronto
Films based on American novels
Films based on Pied Piper of Hamelin
Incest in film
Independent Spirit Award for Best Foreign Film winners
Canadian independent films
1997 independent films
Alliance Atlantis films
Films scored by Mychael Danna
Cannes Grand Prix winners
1990s Canadian films